Presečno may refer to:

 Presečno, Slovenia, a village near Dobje
 Presečno, Croatia, a village near Novi Marof